Luigi Castellazzo (29 September 1827 – 16 December 1890) was an Italian lawyer, politician, writer and supporter of Italian unification, federalism and the Historical Far Left.

Castellazzo was born in Pavia. He fought for Giuseppe Garibaldi, who praised him, though others have criticised him for his 1852 confession to the Austrian police, which was used as the main evidence against the Belfiore martyrs. He died in Pistoia, aged 63.

1827 births
1890 deaths
19th-century Italian lawyers
Politicians from Pavia
19th-century Italian writers
19th-century male writers
Italian people of the Italian unification